The Deer Group Islands are a group of islands in Barkley Sound, British Columbia. Mostly consisting of crown land, they were occupied by the Huu-ay-aht, who moved there after abandoning Kiix-in in the 1880s or 1890s.

References 

Islands of British Columbia
Barkley Sound region